Lake Itasca is a small glacial lake, approximately  in area. Located in southeastern Clearwater County, in the Headwaters area of north central Minnesota, it is notable for being the headwater of the Mississippi River. The lake is in Itasca State Park.

The Ojibwe name for "Lake Itasca" is Omashkoozo-zaaga'igan (Elk Lake); this was changed by Henry Schoolcraft to "Itasca", coined from a combination of the Latin words veritas caput ("true head [of the Mississippi]"). It is one of several examples of pseudo-Indian place names created by Schoolcraft.

Source of the Mississippi River

It is the primary source of the Mississippi River which flows 2,340 mi (3,770 km) to the Gulf of Mexico. There are several tributaries that flow (most or all of the year) into the lake, one of which, by most modern definitions, as with the Nile River and Amazon River, would be considered the actual source, though less dramatic than the lake's outflow. Henry Schoolcraft identified Lake Itasca as the river's primary source in 1832. He had been part of a previous expedition in 1820 led by General Lewis Cass that had named nearby Cass Lake (which is downstream from Itasca) as the source of the river. There exists a dissenting claim that fur trader William Morrison was the first person to discover the lake and identified it as the source of the Mississippi in 1804.

The western arm of the lake is fed by two streams on its south end. Nicollet Creek starts in a nearby spring. Another small stream leads into Itasca from Elk Lake, which in turn is fed by two other streams. The Ojibwa called Elk Lake and the stream Bekegamaag-zaaga'igan and Bekegamaag-ziibi (Sidelake Lake and Sidelake River), respectively. In 1887 Williard Glazier promoted a campaign to consider Elk Lake, which he called Glazier Lake, as the true source of the Mississippi.

Jacob V. Brower, a land surveyor and president of the Minnesota Historical Society, after spending five months exploring the lakes, claimed that the lakes and streams further south of Lake Itasca were not the true source of the Mississippi because they were "too small". Modern explorers and geographers, however, have used the tiniest trickles of water to determine the source of the Amazon, Nile, and other rivers. Brower was to campaign aggressively to save the lake from logging. On April 21, 1891, the Minnesota Legislature officially made it a state park by a margin of one vote. Brower is now called the "Father of Lake Itasca" and the visitor center is named in his honor.

The channel of the Mississippi as it emerges from the lake was bulldozed in the 1930s by the Civilian Conservation Corps, to create a more "pleasant experience" for visitors. The project included the draining of the surrounding swamp, the digging of a new channel, and the installation of a man-made rock rapids. The rocks are used by tourists for walking across the Mississippi River.

Common ground for science

The lake is home to the University of Minnesota's Itasca Biological Station and Laboratories campus, which offers spring and summer courses and field research work year-round. The campus was established in 1909. Some of these buildings date from the 1930s and 40s, while others, including the largest building the Biome Center, were built more recently. The current Director of the biological station is Jonathan Schilling.

The Lake Itasca region claims a unique location, not only at the headwaters of the Mississippi River and amidst 25% of the old growth forest of Minnesota, but also at the juncture of the three great habitats of North America: the Great Plains, the Deciduous Forest of the south, and the Coniferous Forest of the north. Remnants of all three may be observed in the park.

The unique geography of the Lake Itasca region has found its way onto the classical music concert stage. Composer Ferde Grofe depicted the birthplace of the Mississippi River and the Native Americans who reside there in his popular classical epic the Mississippi Suite.

See also
List of Minnesota lakes
USRC Itasca (1907)
USCGC Itasca (1929)

Notes

References

External links
Lake Itasca

Lakes of Clearwater County, Minnesota
Lakes of Minnesota
Lakes of the Mississippi River
Lake Itasca
Glacial lakes of the United States